The Australian tusk, Dannevigia tusca, is a species of cusk-eel found in the waters off of the Great Australian Bight occasionally to Bass Strait at depths from . It is the only known member of its genus and the generic name honours Harold Christian Dannevig (1860-1914) who was the Director of Fisheries for the Australian government, who collected type specimen and who was later lost at sea when the fisheries research vessel he was working on vanished without a trace.

References

Ophidiidae
Fish described in 1941